Büren may refer to the following places:

Germany
Büren, Westphalia, a town near Paderborn, North Rhine-Westphalia
Büren, a village in the municipality of Lotte, North Rhine-Westphalia
Büren, a village in the municipality of Neustadt am Rübenberge, Lower Saxony

Switzerland
Büren, Aargau, part of Gansingen in the canton of Aargau
Büren nid dem Bach, in the canton of Nidwalden
Büren ob dem Bach, in the Canton of Nidwalden]
Büren, Solothurn, in the canton of Solothurn
Büren District, a former district in the canton of Bern
Büren an der Aare in the canton of Bern
Büren zum Hof, in the canton of Bern
Büron, in the canton of Lucerne

Mongolia
Büren, Töv, a sum in Töv Province

See also
Buren (disambiguation)
Bühren, a municipality in Lower Saxony, Germany
Beuren (disambiguation)